Long arm or The Long Arm can refer to:

 The Long Arm (film), a 1956 British film
 The Long Arm (TV series), an Australian TV series
 Yuri Dolgorukiy (c. 1099–1157), the first Rurikid prince to rule in the northern territory of Rostov

See also
 Long-arm jurisdiction, a legal principle
 Long arm of Ankara, a political term concerning Turkish foreign policy
Longarm (disambiguation)
Long Arm of the Law (disambiguation)